Liuba Shrira is a professor of computer science at Brandeis University, whose research interests primarily involve distributed systems.

Liuba Shrira received her PhD from Technion. She is affiliated with the MIT Computer Science and Artificial Intelligence Laboratory.  Previously, she was a researcher in the MIT Programming Methodology Group (1986–1997), a visiting researcher at Microsoft Research (2004–2005), and a visiting professor at Technion (2010–2011).

She is a member of the Association for Computing Machinery (ACM), which has recognized her as a Distinguished Scientist in 2009, and the IEEE Computer Society.

Shrira was one of the founding members of the Systers mailing list for women in computing.

Interests
According to her Brandeis bio page, Shrira is interested in the design and evaluation of system architectures that provide consistency and reliability without compromising on performance. For example, how to provide high-performance reliable storage in the presence of malicious attacks, how can a scalable Internet storage system support consistent sharing for mobile collaborators, how to make long-lived consistent past states available to an application without performance penalty, how to upgrade without down-time a storage system as it evolves over time.

Aside from technology and research she enjoys outdoor activities such as biking, hiking, and exploring caves.

Selected publications

Some of Liuba Shrira's publications include:

 Barbara Liskov; Sanjay Ghemawat; Robert Gruber; Paul Johnson; Liuba Shrira; Michael Williams (1991). "Replication in the Harp File System". 13th ACM Symposium on Operating Systems Principles.
 Rivka Ladin; Barbara Liskov; Liuba Shrira; Sanjay Ghemawat (1992). "Providing high availability using lazy replication". ACM Transactions on Computer Systems.
 Chandrasekhar Boyapati; Barbara Liskov; Liuba Shrira (2003). "Ownership Types for Object Encapsulation". ACM Symposium on Principles of Programming Languages.

References

External links

 Liuba Shrira's homepage
 Google Tech Talk: Split Snapshots: A New Approach to Old State Storage
 Microsoft Research Talk: ACID Objects and Modularity in the Cloud
 Programming Methodology Group publications by Liuba Shrira

American computer scientists
Living people
American women computer scientists
Year of birth missing (living people)
21st-century American women